The 1987 Toledo Rockets football team was an American football team that represented the University of Toledo in the Mid-American Conference (MAC) during the 1987 NCAA Division I-A football season. In their sixth season under head coach Dan Simrell, the Rockets compiled a 3–7–1 record (3–4–1 against MAC opponents), finished in a tie for sixth place in the MAC, and were outscored by all opponents by a combined total of 245 to 165.

The team's statistical leaders included Bill Bergan with 908 passing yards, David Rohrs with 681 rushing yards, and Eric Hutchinson with 431 receiving yards.

Schedule

References

Toledo
Toledo Rockets football seasons
Toledo Rockets football